Little Sandy Creek is a tributary of Redbank Creek, approximately  long, in  northwest Pennsylvania in the United States.

Little Sandy Creek arises in McCalmont Township in Jefferson County and passes through  Oliver Township Beaver Township, Ringgold Township, Worthville, and Redbank Township before joining Redbank Creek in Armstrong County just upstream of the community of Mayport in Clarion County. Its tributaries, in order of their joining, and the populated places that it passes are:

 Middle Branch Little Sandy Creek
 Hickok Run
 Clutch Run
 Hadden Run
 Indiancamp Run
 East Branch
 Coolspring
 Lick Run
 Big Run
 McCracken Run
 Worthville
 Ferguson Run
 Reitz Run
 Langville
 Cherry Run
 Brocious Run
 Nolf Run

See also
 List of rivers of Pennsylvania
 List of tributaries of the Allegheny River

References

Rivers of Pennsylvania
Tributaries of the Allegheny River
Rivers of Jefferson County, Pennsylvania